This is a list of all 64 counties of the U.S. State of Colorado by their points of highest elevation.  Of the 50 highest county high points in the United States, 30 are located in Colorado. The highest point in Colorado is the summit of Mount Elbert in Lake County, the highest summit the entire Rocky Mountains at  elevation.

Of the 64 Colorado counties, 20 counties rise above  elevation, 32 counties rise above , 42 counties rise above , and all 64 Colorado counties rise above .

Use the "Map this section's coordinates" link to view the location of each of the Colorado county high points.


Colorado county high points

Gallery

See also

Colorado
Bibliography of Colorado
Index of Colorado-related articles
Outline of Colorado
Colorado statistical areas
Geography of Colorado
History of Colorado
List of places in Colorado
List of counties in Colorado
List of Colorado county high points
List of highest counties in the United States
List of highest U.S. county high points
Population history of Colorado counties
List of mountain passes in Colorado
List of mountain peaks of Colorado
List of mountain ranges of Colorado
List of populated places in Colorado
List of census-designated places in Colorado
List of county seats in Colorado
List of forts in Colorado
List of ghost towns in Colorado
List of historic places in Colorado
List of municipalities in Colorado
List of populated places in Colorado by county
List of post offices in Colorado
List of rivers of Colorado
List of protected areas of Colorado
List of statistical areas in Colorado

Notes

References

External links

National Geodetic Survey (NGS)
NGS Datasheets
NGVD 29 to NAVD 88 online elevation converter @ NGS
Geodetic Glossary @ NGS
United States Geological Survey (USGS)
Colorado Geological Survey

World Mountain Encyclopedia @ peakware.com
peaklist.org
summitpost.org

Colorado counties
Colorado geography-related lists
Geography of Colorado
Colorado county high points, List of